Patrick Saint-Éloi (20 October 1958 – 18 September 2010) was a Guadeloupean singer and songwriter. He was one of the lead singers of the Zouk and Compas band Kassav'. As a solo artist, he helped create zouk beton, a fast music genre played only by Kassav'. He was also and admired figure of compas or Zouk Love. Saint-Éloi died of cancer in Pointe-à-Pitre in 2010, aged 51. A public tribute was organised in Moule before his burial.

Discography

Studio albums
 Misik Ce Lan-Mou (1982, 2M Production)
 A La Demande (1984, GD Productions)
 Jean-Philippe Marthely / Patrick Saint-Eloi (1985, GD Productions)
 Bizouk (1992, Sonodisc)
 Zoukamine (1994, Sonodisc)
 Martheloi (1996, Martheloi, with Jean-Philippe Marthely)
 Lovtans''' (1998,  	P.S.E. Productions)
 Swing Karaib (2002, P.S.E. Productions, Lusafrica)
 Plézi (2005, P.S.E. Productions)

Live albums
 Live à l'Olympia (2010, P.S.E. Productions, Note A Bene)

Compilations
 Zoukolexion Vol.1 (2007, Note A Bene)
 Zoukolexion Vol.2 (2008, Note A Bene)

 Selected tribute albums and posthumous releases 
 Passion Saint-Eloi'' (2016, Note A Bene, tribute album)

Further reading

References

External links 
 

1958 births
2010 deaths
Zouk musicians
Guadeloupean musicians
French people of Guadeloupean descent
People from Pointe-à-Pitre
Deaths from cancer in France
20th-century French male singers
French male singer-songwriters